Clelin Ferrell (born May 17, 1997) is an American football defensive end for the San Francisco 49ers of the National Football League (NFL). He played college football at Clemson, and was drafted by the Las Vegas Raiders in the first round of the 2019 NFL Draft.

Personal life 
Son to Cleavester and Faye Ferrell, both in the military. Ferrell has four brothers and four sisters, all at least 10 years older than him. His parents enrolled Clelin at Benedictine College Preparatory, a private military academy in Richmond, Virginia, because they believed that he needed some more structure. Clelin’s father, Cleavester, died from cancer in March 2012, when Clelin was a freshman in high school. The entire Benedictine junior varsity team attended the funeral to show their support. Clelin committed to play college football at Clemson nearly three months before he tore his ACL, which caused him to miss his senior football season. Ferrell was still ranked as the fifth best prospect in the state, the seventh best weak-side defensive end, and the No. 101 prospect in the country by 247 Sports.

College career
At Clemson, Ferrell suffered a hand injury that forced him to redshirt the 2015 season. Ferrell stood out as a freshman the following fall, sharing the team's defensive rookie of the year award with Dexter Lawrence after posting 50 tackles, 12.5 for loss, and six sacks in 15 starts. He made an impact in the ACC Championship Game (sack) and national semifinal (Fiesta Bowl Defensive MVP with three tackles for loss, sack) for the eventual title-winners. His sophomore season was even more impressive. Ferrell was named first-team All-American by the Associated Press, first-team All-ACC by league coaches and a finalist for the Ted Hendricks Award as the nation's top defensive end (63 tackles, 18 for loss, 9.5 sacks, two forced fumbles in 14 starts). Clemson coaches named him co-defensive player of the game (two tackles, sack) in the team's loss to Alabama in the Sugar Bowl. The Tigers took care of business in 2018, beating Alabama in that year's national championship thanks in part to Ferrell's All-American play. The first-team All-ACC selection and winner of the Ted Hendricks Award racked up 53 stops, 19.5 for loss, 11.5 sacks, four pass breakups, and three forced fumbles in 15 starts.

On January 13, 2018, Ferrell announced that he would return to Clemson for his junior season. On January 11, 2019, Ferrell announced that he would forgo his final year of eligibility and declare for the 2019 NFL Draft.

College statistics

Professional career

Oakland / Las Vegas Raiders 
Ferrell was drafted by the Oakland Raiders in the first round with the fourth overall pick in the 2019 NFL Draft. This selection was met with great criticism as Ferrell was widely regarded as a late first round pick, while several other defensive linemen more highly-rated than Ferrell like Josh Allen and Ed Oliver were available. On June 18, 2019, Ferrell signed his four-year rookie contract, worth a fully guaranteed $31.2 million, including a $20.8 million signing bonus.

2019

Ferrell made his NFL debut in Week 1 against the Denver Broncos on Monday Night Football. In the game, Ferrell made three tackles and recorded his first sack on Joe Flacco in the 24–16 win. In Week 10 against the Los Angeles Chargers on Thursday Night Football, Ferrell recorded 8 tackles and sacked Philip Rivers 2.5 times in the 26–24 win.

2020
Ferrell was placed on the reserve/COVID-19 list by the Raiders on November 17, 2020, and activated on November 26. In Week 13 against the New York Jets, he recorded two strip sacks on Sam Darnold that were recovered by the Raiders during the 31–28 win. On December 30, 2020, Ferrell was placed on injured reserve. He finished the season with 27 tackles, two sacks, and two forced fumbles through 11 games.

2022
On April 29, 2022, the Raiders announced that they would not pick up the fifth-year option on Ferrell's contract, making him a free agent in the 2023 offseason.

San Francisco 49ers
On March 16, 2023, Ferrell signed a one-year contract with the San Francisco 49ers.

References

External links
  Sports-Reference (college)
 Clemson Tigers Bio
 Las Vegas Raiders bio

1997 births
Living people
All-American college football players
American football defensive ends
Clemson Tigers football players
San Francisco 49ers players
Las Vegas Raiders players
Oakland Raiders players
Players of American football from Richmond, Virginia